The Museum of Saisiyat Folklore is a museum of Saisiyat people in Nanzhuang Township, Miaoli County, Taiwan. The museum is dedicated to the culture of the people and their Festival of Short People.

History
The museum was set up by Miaoli County Government with subsidies from the central government.

Architecture
The museum is a 3-story building. The total floor area of the museum is around 1,800 m2. The finished architecture surface of the museum is wrapped with bamboo-weaving art of the Saisiyat culture and the stone columns are decorated with Saisiyat's special totems.

Transportation
The museum is accessible by bus from Zhunan Station of Taiwan Railways.

See also
 List of museums in Taiwan
 Taiwanese aborigines

References

External links

 

Museums with year of establishment missing
Art museums and galleries in Taiwan
History museums in Taiwan
Folk museums in Asia
Museums in Miaoli County
Ethnic museums in Taiwan
Saisiyat people
Taiwanese folklore